Umberto Maglioli (5 June 1928 – 7 February 1999) was a racing driver from Italy. He participated in 10 Formula One World Championship Grands Prix, debuting on 13 September 1953. He achieved 2 podiums, and scored a total of 3  championship points. He participated in the Targa Florio race nineteen times, winning it three times, and the Mille Miglia ten times, with the best result being a second place in the Lancia Aurelia B20 GT in 1951.

Born in Bioglio, Vercelli, he was introduced to racing by Giovanni Bracco and accompanied him on several Mille Miglias and Targa Florios. In 1953 he won the Targa (single-handed) for the first time, in a Lancia D20, and also the Pescara 12hr race, driving a Ferrari 375 MM with Mike Hawthorn. Maglioli also won the last Carrera Panamericana in 1954, driving the Ferrari 375 Plus. The same year he also won the 1000 km Buenos Aires (with Giuseppe Farina) and the 1000Km Supercortemaggiore at Monza, again with Hawthorn.

He joined Porsche in 1956 and won the Targa Florio, again single-handed. In 1957 under established rules which allowed F2 cars to enter Grand Prix, Porsche entered two 550RSs for the German Grand Prix, one driven by Maglioli and the other by Edgar Barth. Maglioli though failed to finish. Later that year he crashed his Porsche during the Gaisburg hillclimb in Austria. He recuperated in hospital in Salzburg with leg injuries so severe that doctors initially feared he may not walk again. 

In 1964 he won the Sebring 12hrs for Ferrari and in 1968 scored his third Targa victory (this time with Vic Elford) in a works Porsche 907. Maglioli retired from racing in 1970. He died in Monza in 1999.

Racing record

Complete Formula One World Championship results
(key) 

* Indicates Shared Drive with José Froilán González
† Indicates Shared Drive with Giuseppe Farina and Maurice Trintignant
‡ Indicates Shared Drive with Jean Behra

Non-Championship results
(key) (Races in bold indicate pole position)
(Races in italics indicate fastest lap)

References

1928 births
1999 deaths
Italian racing drivers
Italian Formula One drivers
Ferrari Formula One drivers
Maserati Formula One drivers
Porsche Formula One drivers
24 Hours of Le Mans drivers
World Sportscar Championship drivers
24 Hours of Spa drivers
12 Hours of Sebring drivers
Carrera Panamericana drivers
12 Hours of Pescara drivers
12 Hours of Reims drivers